Buszkoiana is a genus of moths in the family Pterophoridae, containing only one species, Buszkoiana capnodactylus, which is known from Hungary, Poland, southern Germany, Denmark, the southern tip of the Netherlands, Belgium, Italy, Austria, the Czech Republic, Slovakia, Romania, Bulgaria, North Macedonia, Albania, Ukraine and southern Russia.

The moth is 18–24 mm for males and 22–27 mm for females. It is one of only few Pterophorinae species which is sexually dimorphic. Males have a dark chocolate brown colour, while females are grey-brown.

The larvae feed on Petasites hybridus. They live inside the stem of their host plant, where pupation also takes place.

Taxonomy
Buszkoiana is the replacement name for Richardia Buszko, 1978

References

Platyptiliini
Moths of Europe
Monotypic moth genera